Penny McCoy (born October 9, 1949) is a former World Cup alpine ski racer from the United States.

At age 16, McCoy won the bronze medal in the women's slalom at the 1966 World Championships in Portillo, Chile, held in August. She had six top ten finishes in World Cup competition.

Shortly before the 1968 Olympics, McCoy and Sandy Shellworth were left off the U.S. team by head coach Bob Beattie, displaced by new arrivals Kiki Cutter and Judy Nagel. Shellworth did get to compete, as an injury replacement in the downhill, but McCoy did not.

World Cup results
6 top ten finishes - (4 SL, 2 GS)

Personal
McCoy is the daughter of Dave McCoy (b. 1915), the founder of Mammoth Mountain Ski Area in California in 1953. She and her five siblings were raised in nearby Bishop. McCoy is the sister of Dennis McCoy (b. 1945), who was also a World Cup racer. He finished 21st in the downhill at the 1968 Olympics. She was formerly married to stuntman Stan Barrett (b. 1943), stuntmen David Barrett and Stanton Barrett (b. 1972) are their sons.

References

External links

Penny McCoy at the U.S. Ski Hall of Fame and Museum
Real Penny McCoy.com – speaker
Power to Change.com – Penny McCoy

1950 births
Living people
American female alpine skiers
People from Bishop, California
Racing drivers' wives and girlfriends
Sportspeople from California
21st-century American women